Liu Xin (born 5 November 1986, Anda) is a Chinese road bicycle racer. She competed at the 2012 Summer Olympics in the Women's road race, but finished over the time limit.

References

Chinese female cyclists
Living people
Olympic cyclists of China
Cyclists at the 2012 Summer Olympics
Asian Games medalists in cycling
Cyclists at the 2010 Asian Games
Medalists at the 2010 Asian Games
Asian Games gold medalists for China
People from Anda
Sportspeople from Heilongjiang
1986 births
21st-century Chinese women